This is the complete list of all episodes from Japanese anime, Yakitate!! Japan, directed by Yasunao Aoki. It is based on a manga by Takashi Hashiguchi. It first aired in Japan from October 12, 2004 to March 14, 2006 and spanned a total of 69 episodes. The anime concluded before the manga, and thus the ending is non-canon.

Episode list

Pantasia Newcomers Battle Arc

Monaco Cup Arc

Yakitate!! 9 Arc

References

Yakitate!! Japan